The discography of English post-punk band Rip Rig + Panic consists of four studio albums, one compilation album and seven singles.

Albums

Studio albums

Compilation albums

Singles

References

External links
 Rip Rig + Panic at AllMusic
 
 

Discography
Discographies of British artists
Punk rock group discographies
Rock music group discographies